
Indira Col West is a mountain pass at ) altitude on the Indira Ridge of Siachen Muztagh in Karakoram Range. It is on the border between Indian-controlled Siachen Glacier and the Chinese-controlled Trans-Karakoram Tract (both in the disputed Kashmir region), close to the tripoint of India, Pakistan, and China. 
The India-Pakistan Actual Ground Position Line (AGPL) in the Siachen area ends near the pass. 
It is possible to ascend the pass from both the north and south sides controlled by China and India respectively.

Indira Col East (Coord ), also Main Indira Col or just Indira Col, is another col on Indira Ridge which lies 2.4 km further east of Indira Col West at ) altitude. It is more difficult to ascend or descend on the north side controlled by China, but easier to do so from the south side controlled by India.

India Saddle (Coord ), a geographical saddle, connects the Indira Col East and Indira Col West.

Indira Ridge separates the Chinese-controlled Trans-Karakoram Tract, which lies north of Indira Ridge, from the Siachen Glacier, which lies south of Indira Ridge. The AGPL end point, Indira Col West, Indira Col East, Indira Saddle, Turkestan La North, and Turkestan La East lie on the Indira Ridge from west to east.

History

Etymology
The la in Ladakhi language means a mountain pass. The eastern col was named Indira Col in 1912 by Bullock Workman, after one of the names of the goddess Lakshmi.

Exploration 

In 1889, British raj army officer and explorer Francis Younghusband reached the base of Turkestan La (North) from north side, and he noted that this was a long glacier and a major Central Asian dividing range.

Colonel Narendra "Bull" Kumar reached Indira Col (the western col) in 1981.  In 1998 Harish Kapadia reached the same col; on his map and text he refers to it as the "main Indira Col" and "Indira Col West", whereas he refers to the col 2.4 km to the east as the "Indira Col East (Workman)."
 Indirakoli Pass（） name on the Chinese maps refers to  coordinates is claimed by Pakistan, which is "Indira Col East".

In 1984, Indian soldiers traveled across Siachen glacier, scaled many peaks and passes including the Indira Col as part of the Operation Meghdoot.

After that, Harish Kapadia and his colleagues also explored various peaks passes, ranges subranges and glaciers in the Siachen area.

Disputed territories 

Territories on all sides of Indira Col are disputed. Area south of the Indira Col West is controlled by India and also claimed by Pakistan. North of Indira Col West is Trans-Karakoram Tract claimed by India but controlled by China under a 1963 border agreement with Pakistan. The AGPL generally runs along the Saltoro Mountains range, beginning from the northernmost point of the (LOC) at Point NJ 9842 and ending northwest of Indira Col West in the north, with peaks in excess of 7,000 meters and average low temperatures around minus 50 Celsius.

Geography

India-China-Pakistan borders 
Indira Col is near the tri-junction of India-China-Pakistan controlled areas.

Indira Ridge's features 

Indira Ridge, from west to east, has following features: 
 Sia Kangri, 
 Indira Col West ,
 India Saddle ,
 Indira Col East, 
 Turkestan La (North) (Younghusband) (coordinates ) which was identified by the British explorer Younghusband, and
 Turkestan La (East) (traditional) (coordinates ) which is an ancient or "traditional" pass.

AGPL end point 
 AGPL end point,

India Saddle 

Between Indira Col West and Indira Col East is India Saddle between the Siachen Glacier to the south and the Urdok Glacier to the north in the Shaksgam (Trans-Karakoram Tract), on the watershed between the Indus River basin and the Tarim Basin. It is too steep to easily descend north from the col to the Urdok Glacier.

Siachen Glacier's topography 

The main channel of Siachen Glacier, which flows from north to south into India, begins from the southern slope of Indira Col West. The Urdok Glacier, which flows from south to north into Trans-Karakoram Tract held by China, begins from the northern slope of Indira Col West, its subbranches Urdok I glacier flows from north to northwest from the northern slope of India Col East and Urdok II glacier flows north to northwest from the northern slope of Turkmenistan La North.

Straghar Glacier runs perpendicular to the Indira Ridge on the eastern side of the ridge (and serves as the LAC between Trans-Karakoram Tract held by China and Daulat Beg Oldi (DBO) held by India). The Siachen Glacier is explored from the Siachen Base Camp, reachable via Leh-Khalsar-Sasoma army camp-Siachen Base camp road, to the Station A which is the point where main channel of Siachen Glacier meets the Teram Shehr Glacier. From the Station A, the route goes north to Indira Col West.

See also 

 Borders
 Actual Ground Position Line (AGPL)
 India–Pakistan International Border (IB)
 Line of Control (LoC)
 Line of Actual Control (LAC)
 Sir Creek (SC)
 Borders of China
 Borders of India
 Borders of Pakistan

 Conflicts
 Kashmir conflict
 Siachen conflict
 Sino-Indian conflict
 List of disputed territories of China
 List of disputed territories of India
 List of disputed territories of Pakistan
 Northern Areas
 Trans-Karakoram Tract

 Operations
 Operation Meghdoot 1984 in Siachen, by India
 Operation Rajiv 1987 in Siachen, by India
 Operation Safed Sagar 1999 in Kargil War, by India

 Other related topics
 Awards and decorations of the Indian Armed Forces
 Bana Singh, after whom Quaid Post was renamed to Bana Top 
 Dafdar, westernmost town in Trans-Karakoram Tract
 India-China Border Roads
 List of extreme points of India
 Sino-Pakistan Agreement for transfer of Trans-Karakoram Tract to China

References

External links 
Map at Blank on the Map

Karakoram
Mountain passes of Ladakh
Border tripoints
India–Pakistan border
Mountain passes of India
China–India border
Mountain passes of China
Mountain passes of Xinjiang